Le Bourg-d'Oisans is a commune in the Isère department in southeastern France.

It is located in the Oisans region of the French Alps. Le Bourg-d'Oisans is located in the valley of the Romanche river, on the road from Grenoble to Briançon, and on the south side of the Col de la Croix de Fer.  It is often on the route of the Tour de France, as the town sits at the base of the road climbing to Alpe d'Huez with 21 hairpin bends.

It is surrounded by several well-known mountain resorts, including the Alpe d'Huez and Les Deux Alpes. The Écrins National Park lies to the southeast of Le Bourg-d'Oisans.

Population

See also
Communes of the Isère department
Livet-et-Gavet
Alpe d'Huez

References

Communes of Isère
Isère communes articles needing translation from French Wikipedia